Harry Noble Wright (1881-1969) served as the sixth president of the City College of New York between 1941 and 1953. Wright received his degree in mathematics at Earlham College in 1904, continuing on to his doctorate in 1913 at the University of California. He served as dean and president of Whittier College between 1917 and 1924, later returning to Earlham as an instructor and dean. Wright was awarded an honorary Doctor of Laws (LL.D.) degree from Whittier College in 1947.  In 1931, he was hired by CCNY as an instructor in 1931 and became the director of summer and evening sessions in 1939.

References

1881 births
1969 deaths
Presidents of City College of New York
Presidents of Whittier College
Earlham College alumni
University of California alumni
City College of New York faculty
19th-century American educators
20th-century American academics